Vierkirchen is a municipality in the district Görlitz, Saxony, Germany.

References

Populated places in Görlitz (district)